Apia Muri is a Papua New Guinean professional basketball player. He is one of the country's most prominent basketball figures. 

He led Papua New Guinea's national basketball team all the way to the bronze medal match of the 2015 Pacific Games, where he recorded most minutes, points, rebounds and blocks for his team.

References

External links
3x3 Planet Profile 
australiabasket.com Profile

Living people
Power forwards (basketball)
Centers (basketball)
Papua New Guinean men's basketball players
Year of birth missing (living people)
Place of birth missing (living people)